Taoyuan International Airport Corporation (TIAC) is a government-owned corporation responsible for the management of Taiwan Taoyuan International Airport. It is a company based in Taoyuan, Taiwan, Republic of China, established on November 1, 2010.

Organizational structure
 Operation Safety Department
 Labor Safety and Health Office
 Airside Management Department
 Business Department
 Cargo Department
 Aviation Fuel Department
 Ethics Department
 Aviation Museum
 Finance Department
 Accounting Department
 General Affairs Department
 Procurement Center
 Information Technology Department
 Human Resources Department
 Business Planning and Marketing Department
 Public Affairs Division
 Legal Affairs Division
 Maintenance Department
 Engineering Department

Management

Chairman
 Samuel Lin (31 July 2015 - 7 June 2016)
 Tseng Dar-jen (8 June 2016 - 11 Oct 2018)
 Wang, Ming-The (2 Jan 2019 - )

Chief Executive Officers
 Fei Hourng-jiun (16 December 2013 - 7 June 2016)
 Hsiao Ting-ko (8 June 2016 -Jan 2 2019)

See also
 Taiwan Taoyuan International Airport

References

External links
 Taoyuan Airport Corporation 

Companies based in Taoyuan City
Airport operators
Government-owned companies of Taiwan